Albert Béltran Mir is a Spanish field hockey player who plays as a forward for Dutch Hoofdklasse club Klein Zwitserland and the Spanish national team.

He competed in the 2020 Summer Olympics.

Club career
Béltran played for Atlètic Terrassa until 2017 when he signed for Rotterdam in the Dutch Hoofdklasse. He played there for two season when he returned to Atlètic Terrassa. After the 2020 Summer Olympics he returned to the Netherlands and signed for Klein Zwitserland.

References

External links

1993 births
Living people
2018 Men's Hockey World Cup players
Field hockey players at the 2020 Summer Olympics
Spanish male field hockey players
Olympic field hockey players of Spain
Male field hockey forwards
Place of birth missing (living people)
Atlètic Terrassa players
División de Honor de Hockey Hierba players
HC Rotterdam players
Men's Hoofdklasse Hockey players
HC Klein Zwitserland players